The Rancho Cucamonga Quakes are a Minor League Baseball team of the California League and the Single-A affiliate of the Los Angeles Dodgers. They are located in Rancho Cucamonga, California, and play their home games at LoanMart Field.

The franchise was founded in Lodi, California, in 1966 as members of the California League, with its home ballpark as Tony Zupo Field. The team then went through several new names and ownership changes before arriving in Rancho Cucamonga in 1993. In the 2021 reorganization of the minor leagues, the California League disbanded and was replaced by the Low-A-West, but this was renamed the California League in 2022.

The Quakes have three California League championships (1994, 2015, and 2018).

History

Early years
The Quakes franchise began in 1966 in Lodi, California as the Lodi Crushers after a team of investors from the city pooled together $2,500 a few years earlier. Until 1984, the team played at Lawrence Park (now Tony Zupo Field) for home games. Several times in its early history, the team was sold from one group of collaborating town residents to another. Since 1966, the franchise has been affiliated with several major league teams, notably the Los Angeles Dodgers in the late 1970s and the Chicago Cubs in the early 1980s. While in Lodi, the team won several California League Championships, including 1973, 1977 and 1981.

After 1984, the Chicago Cubs pulled out of Lodi, and the franchise's owner Michelle Sprague was unable to find a major league affiliate. She deactivated the team for a year, selling the team to a group including former L.A. Dodger Ken McMullen. After spending time in Ventura, under new ownership (a group of investors including Roy Englebrecht, actor Mark Harmon, and former Quakes' majority owner Hank Stickney), the team moved to San Bernardino in 1987 and became the San Bernardino Spirit. Ken Griffey Jr. was among the players that came through Fiscalini Field on their way to the big leagues.

Move to Rancho Cucamonga

In the early 1990s, Stickney was informed by the city of Rancho Cucamonga that they would be breaking ground on a new stadium. Selling the rights to the name "The San Bernardino Spirit" to a different franchise, the main staff of Stickney's team moved outside the construction zone where the ballpark would be built. Construction started on November 14, 1991. Named "The Quake" after a vote, the stadium was nicknamed the "Epicenter". The team moved into the stadium on April 1, 1993. The Rancho Cucamonga Quakes played their first game at the stadium on April 8 against the High Desert Mavericks, winning 7–3. The Quakes won their first California League championship in 1994, defeating the Modesto A's in four games.

The Quakes continue to play their home games at the stadium, now renamed LoanMart Field. The stadium held up to 7000 fans in its first few years of existence, but renovations in  2014 and 2015 reduced its capacity to just over 4900 total fans.  During the late 1990s and 2000s, the Quakes broke several league attendance records.

After being an affiliate of the San Diego Padres for the first eight years in Rancho Cucamonga, the team swapped affiliations with the Lake Elsinore Storm, beginning the 2001 season. For the next ten seasons, the Quakes were affiliated with the Los Angeles Angels of Anaheim. In 2010, its final year of affiliation with the Angels, the team advanced to the California League championship round, losing in extra innings in the fifth and deciding game to the San Jose Giants. After the season, the Quakes once again changed affiliations, joining the Dodgers' system.

Television actor Mark Harmon (St. Elsewhere, NCIS) was one of the team's owners until he sold his interest in the team to local businessman Scott Ostlund.  Since 2009, the team has been owned and operated by Brett Sports and Entertainment, headed by former Kansas City Royals Hall of Famer George Brett and his brother Bobby Brett.

In conjunction with Major League Baseball's restructuring of Minor League Baseball in 2021, the Quakes were organized into the Low-A West. In 2022, the Low-A West became known as the California League, the name historically used by the regional circuit prior to the 2021 reorganization, and was reclassified as a Single-A circuit.

Branding, media
The mascot of the Rancho Cucamonga Quakes is Tremor, the "Rallysaurus".

Joe Castellano was the team's first play-by-play announcer; he later moved on to the Triple-A Rochester Red Wings, and now works for XM Satellite Radio on the MLB Home Plate channel. The Quakes are currently in their second year with their current broadcast partner, IE NewsTalk 1290 with Mike Lindskog calling the play-by-play. NewsTalk 1290 is owned by iHeartMedia, Inc.. It airs a talk radio format for the Inland Empire region of Southern California including Riverside and San Bernardino..

Past team names
 
San Bernardino Spirit (1987–1992)
 Ventura County Gulls (1986)
 Lodi Dodgers (1976–1983)
 Lodi Orioles (1974–1975)
 Lodi Lions (1973)
 Lodi Orions (1972)
 Lodi Padres (1970–1971)
 Lodi Crushers (1966–1969, 1984)

Past major league affiliations
 
 Los Angeles Angels (2001–2010)
 San Diego Padres (1993–2000)
 Seattle Mariners (1988–1992)
 Toronto Blue Jays (1986)
 Los Angeles Dodgers (1976–1983, 1995)
 Baltimore Orioles (1972–1975)
 San Diego Padres (1970–1971)
 Oakland Athletics (1969)
 Chicago Cubs (1966–1968, 1984)

Notable Quakes alumni

Erick Aybar
Cody Bellinger
Peter Bourjos
Walker Buehler
Jeter Downs
Tony Gonsolin
Bobby Jenks
Howie Kendrick
Dean Kremer
Derrek Lee
Gavin Lux
Dustin May
Kendrys Morales
Mike Napoli
Wil Nieves
Joc Pederson
Yasiel Puig
Francisco Rodríguez
Bubby Rossman
Ervin Santana
Joe Saunders
Corey Seager
Will Smith
Mike Trout
Mark Trumbo
Julio Urias
Jordan Walden
Jered Weaver

Roster

Player gallery

References

External links
Official website

Baseball teams established in 1966
Sports in the Inland Empire
Sports in Rancho Cucamonga, California
Anaheim Angels minor league affiliates
Baltimore Orioles minor league affiliates
Chicago Cubs minor league affiliates
Los Angeles Angels of Anaheim minor league affiliates
Los Angeles Dodgers minor league affiliates
Oakland Athletics minor league affiliates
San Diego Padres minor league affiliates
Seattle Mariners minor league affiliates
Toronto Blue Jays minor league affiliates
California League teams
Sports in San Bernardino County, California
Professional baseball teams in California
1966 establishments in California